Events in the year 1931 in Egypt.

Incumbents

 King: Fuad I of Egypt
 Prime minister: Ismail Sidky

Births

 8 February – Shadia, actress (d. 2017)
 27 May – Faten Hamama, actress (d. 2015)
 27 October – Nawal El Saadawi, feminist (d. 2021)

References

 
Years of the 20th century in Egypt
Egypt
Egypt